In geometry, the truncated order-8 octagonal tiling is a uniform tiling of the hyperbolic plane. It has Schläfli symbol of t0,1{8,8}.

Uniform colorings 
This tiling can also be constructed in *884 symmetry with 3 colors of faces:

Related polyhedra and tiling

Symmetry 
The dual of the tiling represents the fundamental domains of (*884) orbifold symmetry. From [(8,8,4)] (*884) symmetry, there are 15 small index subgroup (11 unique) by mirror removal and alternation operators. Mirrors can be removed if its branch orders are all even, and cuts neighboring branch orders in half. Removing two mirrors leaves a half-order gyration point where the removed mirrors met. In these images fundamental domains are alternately colored black and white, and mirrors exist on the boundaries between colors. The symmetry can be doubled to 882 symmetry by adding a bisecting mirror across the fundamental domains. The subgroup index-8 group, [(1+,8,1+,8,1+,4)] (442442) is the commutator subgroup of [(8,8,4)].

References
 John H. Conway, Heidi Burgiel, Chaim Goodman-Strass, The Symmetries of Things 2008,  (Chapter 19, The Hyperbolic Archimedean Tessellations)

See also
Square tiling
Tilings of regular polygons
List of uniform planar tilings
List of regular polytopes

External links 

 Hyperbolic and Spherical Tiling Gallery
 KaleidoTile 3: Educational software to create spherical, planar and hyperbolic tilings
 Hyperbolic Planar Tessellations, Don Hatch

Hyperbolic tilings
Isogonal tilings
Order-8 tilings
Truncated tilings
Uniform tilings
Octagonal tilings